Philotarsidae is a family of Psocodea (formerly Psocoptera) belonging to the suborder Psocomorpha. The family is closely related to the family Pseudocaeciliidae, both within the infraorder Philotarsetae.

It includes the following genera:
 Aaroniella Mockford, 1951
 Abelopsocus Schmidt & New, 2008
 Garcialdretia Mockford, 2007
 Haplophallus Thornton, 1959
 Nocopsocus Thornton, 1984
 Philotarsopsis Tillyard, 1923
 Philotarsus Kolbe, 1880
 Tarsophilus Mockford & Broadhead, 1982

Sources 

 Lienhard, C. & Smithers, C. N. 2002. Psocoptera (Insecta): World Catalogue and Bibliography. Instrumenta Biodiversitatis, vol. 5. Muséum d'histoire naturelle, Genève.

Psocoptera families
Psocomorpha